Marilyn Hassett (born December 17, 1947) is an American actress. She is best known for playing the role of Jill Kinmont in the romance drama film The Other Side of the Mountain (1975) for which she received Golden Globe Awards and its sequel The Other Side of the Mountain Part 2 (1978). Hassett also starred in films Shadow of the Hawk (1976) and The Bell Jar (1979).

Life and career
Hassett was born in Los Angeles, California. She first appeared in a bit role in the 1969 drama film They Shoot Horses, Don't They?, and the following year co-starred in the made-for-television ABC Movie of the Week Quarantined. Hassett later guest-starred on Emergency!, The Six Million Dollar Man and Movin' On.

In 1975, Hassett starred as ski racing champion Jill Kinmont in the drama film The Other Side of the Mountain (1975), which was directed by Larry Peerce, who chose her for the lead from several hundred hopefuls. She received some positive reviews from critics and consequently won a Golden Globe in 1976 for New Star of the Year and well as was nominated on Golden Globe Award for Best Actress in a Motion Picture – Drama. The Other Side of the Mountain was one of the most successful box office releases for Universal Pictures in years and was said to have helped the company survive a difficult period. In 1978 the studio released its sequel, The Other Side of the Mountain Part 2.

Hassett starred alongside Jan-Michael Vincent in the 1976 cult classic film Shadow of the Hawk, and the same year appeared in Two-Minute Warning directed by her then-husband Larry Peerce. In 1979, she starred in the film adaptation of Sylvia Plath's novel The Bell Jar, also directed by Peerce. The film was not well received. The following years, Hassett appeared in a number of smaller-scale movies and guest-starred on television series including Hotel, Murder, She Wrote and The Hitchhiker.

Filmography

References

External links

1947 births
Living people
American film actresses
American television actresses
Actresses from Los Angeles
New Star of the Year (Actress) Golden Globe winners
21st-century American women